The Weston school shooting was a school shooting that occurred on September 29, 2006, in Weston High School in Cazenovia, Wisconsin, United States. The perpetrator, student Eric Hainstock, entered the school's main hallway with a revolver and fatally shot principal John Klang. He is serving a life sentence and will be eligible for parole in 2037.

Details
On 29 September 2006, Eric Hainstock, a 15 year old freshman at Weston High School, entered the main hallway of the school with a .22 caliber revolver and a 20-gauge shotgun taken from his father's locked gun cabinet. After arriving at school around 8:00 a.m., he aimed the shotgun at a social studies teacher. The school custodian, Dave Thompson, wrestled the shotgun away from Hainstock. Principal John Alfred Klang then entered the hallway and confronted Hainstock, who was still armed with the handgun. Hainstock grabbed the revolver from inside his jacket and fired several shots. Klang then grabbed Hainstock, wrestled him to the ground and swept away the gun. Klang was on top of Hainstock, a pool of blood by Klang's leg. Staff and students apprehended Hainstock, holding him until the police arrived.

Klang was treated at Reedsburg Area Medical Center where he underwent surgery, and was then flown to the University of Wisconsin Hospital in Madison, where he died shortly after 3 p.m. Klang was the only one shot in the shooting. For his actions in wrestling away the gun and subduing Hainstock, Klang was posthumously awarded the Carnegie Medal by the Carnegie Hero Fund.

The high school students were initially taken to the elementary school gym, where they had the option to talk to a crisis counselor or go home. The elementary students were taken home by bus or by their parents. The homecoming events were canceled.

Perpetrator
The perpetrator of the shooting was 15-year-old Eric Hainstock, a freshman at Weston High School. Hainstock lived with his father and stepmother in a two-story A-Frame farm house about four miles northwest of Cazenovia in La Valle located on a hill surrounded by farm land. Eric Hainstock was born on April 4, 1991 in La Crosse, Wisconsin to Shawn Hainstock and Lisa Marie Buttke. His parents divorced when he was two years old, and in December 1995 went to court to seek custody of Eric. When Hainstock was nine, his mother's parental rights were terminated by court-order after she failed to pay child support.

His father remarried and Eric was adopted by his stepmother. Hainstock's father was unemployed and received disability pensions. In September 2001, the Sauk County Department of Children and Families were called to the residence after he had allegedly kicked his son. By court-order, Eric was forced to live with his paternal grandmother, before he returned to his father's care in April 2002. In a letter he submitted to Madison based newspaper Isthmus, Eric claimed he was treated like a slave by his father, having to do all of the cleaning, even having to clean past midnight. He claimed to have been severely disciplined by his father. He claimed that his father would make him stand in his bedroom corner with his nose touching a wall and holding one of his legs in the air for long periods.

At Weston High School, Eric claimed that about 25 to 30 students bullied him. When he complained to the faculty at the school, Eric claims that nothing was done to prevent the bullying. In early 2006, Hainstock had started his fifth year at Weston High School where he had transferred in 6th grade, after having behavior problems and relatively poor test scores at his previous school. On one occasion shortly before the shooting, Eric and his stepmother were involved in a physical confrontation and Eric was left with human bite marks on him. After Eric shot John Klang, he told police that he had not meant to hurt him; his goal was to confront him and "make him listen" about the bullying. He reported that he was only allowed to shower once a week, which left him with poor hygiene. The clothes and shoes that his father bought for him were in poor condition and were not the right size.

It later transpired that as a student, Eric had been under medication and using prescription drugs in a bid to treat ADHD. Dr. Peter Breggin, a doctor and an expert on the US drug industry  has theorized that there is a possibility that these prescription drugs could have caused imbalances in Eric, leading to him carrying out the shooting.

While in prison, Michael Caldwell from Middleton, Wisconsin diagnosed Eric with attention deficit hyperactivity disorder.

Imprisonment 
Hainstock was charged with first-degree murder by the Sauk County District Attorney's office, and was found guilty on August 2, 2007. He was sentenced to life imprisonment, and will be eligible for parole in 2037 when he is 46 years old.

Hainstock is currently serving his sentence at Oshkosh Correctional Institution after previously being incarcerated at the Green Bay Correctional Institution in Green Bay, Wisconsin. While in prison, he has allowed Isthmus to share his story. He has written a ten-page letter with the help of his cellmate. According to Hainstock, he has gained 50 pounds, his reading went from a fourth-grade level to a tenth-grade level, and he is working on his GED. Hainstock's father and stepmother Priscilla visit him about every month. In his letter, Hainstock takes responsibility for what he did, but he believes that he is not to blame for everything. In October 2008, Hainstock's supportive cellmate at Green Bay was reassigned without any official explanation.

See also
 List of homicides in Wisconsin
List of school shootings in the United States

References

External links
 Official website of Weston High School
 Wisconsin State Journal eyewitness account
 Wisconsin State Journal article on aftermath and legal repercussions
 MSNBC Report on the event

2006 in Wisconsin
2006 murders in the United States
Crimes in Wisconsin
Deaths by firearm in Wisconsin
School shootings committed by pupils
Murder in Wisconsin
Sauk County, Wisconsin
School killings in the United States
September 2006 events in the United States
High school shootings in the United States